Martin Lee is a Hong Kong politician.

Martin Lee may also refer to:

Martin Lee (New York politician), 19th-century New York politician
Martin Lee (singer) (born 1949), British singer and composer for Brotherhood of Man
Martin Lee (tennis) (born 1978), British tennis player
Martin A. Lee, American author and leftist
Martin Lee Ka-shing (born 1971), vice-chairman of Henderson Land Development and the son of Hong Kong billionaire Lee Shau Kee
Martin Lee, Australian drummer with Regurgitator
Martin Lee, member of the Irish Republican Army

See also
Martyn Lee (disambiguation)